Bakur Gogitidze (born 9 October 1973) is a Georgian wrestler. He competed in the men's Greco-Roman 100 kg at the 1996 Summer Olympics.

References

1973 births
Living people
Male sport wrestlers from Georgia (country)
Olympic wrestlers of Georgia (country)
Wrestlers at the 1996 Summer Olympics
Sportspeople from Tbilisi